Henrique Jorge Pereira Brito (born 21 April 1997 in Braga) is a Portuguese professional footballer who plays as a defender.

Football career
On 30 July 2016, Brito made his professional debut with Gil Vicente  in a 2016–17 Taça da Liga match against Académica.

International career
Born in Portugal, Brito is of Cape Verdean descent. He was called up to represent the Cape Verde national team for 2022 FIFA World Cup qualification matches in September 2021.

References

External links

Stats and profile at LPFP 

1997 births
Sportspeople from Braga
Living people
Portuguese footballers
Portuguese sportspeople of Cape Verdean descent
Association football defenders
Gil Vicente F.C. players
F.C. Felgueiras 1932 players
Liga Portugal 2 players
Campeonato de Portugal (league) players